An incomplete list of events in 1132 in Italy:

 Battle of Nocera
The Battle of Nocera or Scafati was the first major battle of Roger II of Sicily and one of two of his major defeats (the other being the Battle of Rignano) at the hands of Count Ranulf of Alife.

 Construction of Cappella Palatina in Palermo begins
 Sicilian monarchy founded by Norman king Roger II

Italy
Italy
Years of the 12th century in Italy